The  is a bus company within the Keikyu Group which was established on 10 April 2003 to inherit all business of the Keihin Kyuko Electric Railway bus department.

Outline
The bus company was established in April 2003 and has operated since 1 October 2003. Besides, the bus company was split into Haneda Keikyu Bus and Yokohama Keikyu Bus, Shonan Keikyu Bus, but the bus companies were merged into Keihin Kyuko Bus on 1 April 2018.
Service area is located around Tokyo(Haneda Airport) and Kanagawa(Miura and Kamakura).

History

Chronicle
Keihin Kyuko Bus was split up from Keihin Kyuko Electric Railway and had spin-off companies which Haneda Keikyu Bus and Yokohama Keikyu Bus and Yokosuka Keikyu Bus, Keikyu Kanko Bus, Toyo Kanko were.
in October 2003: Keihin Kyuko Bus was transferred bus routes which were left from Keikyu Electric Railway.
in June 2006:As Kamakura Office was established, changed corporation name from Yokosuka Keikyu Bus to Shonan Keikyu Bus.
on 18 March 2007:Start to available on Pasmo in a part of bus routes.
on 15 March 2008:Keikyu Kanko Bus withdrew from a bus department.
on 30 November 2012:Haneda Office was discontinued when the buses departured in the day. 
on 1 April 2018:haneda Keikyu Bus and Yokohama Keikyu Bus, Shonan Keikyu Bus were merger and acquisition to Keihin Kyuko Bus. And, Haneda Office was established again.
on 17 September:Head office was transferred to Keikyu Group Head Office which is located Minato Mirai 21 in Yokohama.

Local bus services

Offices
All vehicles are put on office code because distinguish a lot of vehicles.
 Omori Office (code:M)
 Haneda Office (code:H)
 Keihinjima Office (code:K)
 Shin-Koyasu Office (code:J)
 Sugita Office (code:Y)
 Oppama Office (code:A)
 Nokendai Office (code:N)
 Horinouchi Office (code:B)
Kamakura Office (code:C)
Zushi Office (code:D)
Kinugasa　Office (code:E)
Kurihama Office (code:F)
Misaki Office (code:G)

Bus routes
The bus company does not have a night bus.

Highway buses
The bus routes which "◆" have are available on IC Card (Suica, Pasmo).
 Yokohama Royal Park Hotel/ Yamashita Park/ Yokohama Station - Tokyo Disney Resort (operated with Keisei Bus) ◆
 Kawasaki Station/ Kamata Station (Tokyo) - Tokyo Disney Resort (operated with Keisei Bus) ◆
 Yokohama Station(YCAT) / Odaiba - Tokyo Big Sight ◆
 (Yokohama・Higashi-ogijima Line) Yokohama Station (YCAT) - Higashi-ogijima (operated with Kawasaki Tsurumi Rinko Bus) ◆
 (Yokohama・Ukishima Line) Yokohama Station (YCAT) - Kojima/Ukishima (Ekawa 1chome) (operated with Kawasaki Tsurumi Rinko Bus) ◆
 Yokohama Station(YCAT) - Makuhari Messe Chuo (operated with Keisei Bus)
 Yokohama Station(YCAT)  - Hayama/Yokosuka◆
 Yokohama Station(YCAT)  - Yokohama Hakkeijima Sea Paradise ◆
 Shinagawa Station - Gotemba Premium Outlet ◆
 Yokohama Station(YCAT) - Katsunumabudokyo Station - Ichinomiya - Isawaonsen Station - Yamanashi Gakuin University - Kofu Station - Ryuo Station (operated with Yamanashi Kotsu>
 Shinagawa Station - Sodegaura B・T - Kisarazu Station◆ (operated with Kominato Railway・Nitto Kotsu)
 Shinagawa Station - Sodegaura B・T - Sodegaura Station - Nagaura Station (Chiba)◆ (operated with Kominato Railway・Nitto Kotsu)
 Yokohama Station - Sodegaura B・T - Kisarazu Station - Kazusa Arc◆ (operated with Kominato Railway・Nitto Kotsu)
 Yokohama Station - Goi Station◆ (operated with Kominato Railway)
 Shinagawa Station - Mitsui Outlet Park◆ (operated with Kominato Railway)
Yokohama Station - Kimitsu Station/Tateyama Station (Chiba)◆
Yokohama Station/Haneda Airport - Mobara Station◆
Haneda Airport/Yokohama Station - Gotemba Station - Tōgendai Station◆ (operated with Odakyu Hakone Highway Bus)
Yokohama Station/HanedaAirport - Tobu Nikko Station/Kinugawaonsen Station◆
Haneda Airport/Shinagawa Station - Kawaguchiko Station/Fujisan Station◆

Vehicles

See also
 Tokyo-Wan Ferry

References

External links 
 Official Website(ja)

Bus transport in Tokyo
Transport in Kanagawa Prefecture
Bus companies of Japan